The Howling Commandos is the name of several fictional groups appearing in American comic books published by Marvel Comics.

Fictional team history

World War II

The first group of Howling Commandos (introduced in their own 1963 comic book series) was an elite unit of the United States Army Rangers formed in World War II. The original team consisted of:

 Sergeant Nicholas Joseph "Nick" Fury
 Corporal Timothy Aloysius Cadwallader "Dum Dum" Dugan
 Private Isadore "Izzy" Cohen
 Private Gabriel Jones
 Private Dino Manelli
 Private Robert "Rebel" Ralston
 Private Jonathan "Junior" Juniper
 Private Percival "Pinky" Pinkerton: A British soldier, in issue #8.
 Private Eric Koenig: A defector from Nazi Germany. He joined the squad in issue #27.
 Private Jim Morita
 Private Jacques "Frenchie" Dernier

Occasional other members would join for an issue or two before being killed, transferred, or otherwise leaving (such as Fred Jones in issue #81). Also daringly for the time, the series killed Fury's girlfriend, British nurse Pamela Hawley, introduced in issue #4 and killed in a London air raid in #18.

Nick Fury's Howling Commandos

A second Howling Commandos team was introduced in the 2005 series Nick Fury's Howling Commandos as a supernatural unit that works for S.H.I.E.L.D. Its members were:

 Clay Quartermain: The commanding officer of Area 13. He takes over in the first issue from Dum Dum Dugan.
 Warwolf (real name Vince Marcus): The field leader. He is a werewolf who can transform voluntarily whenever Mars is in the night sky.
 Nina Price, Vampire by Night: A woman who is half-vampire and half-werewolf.
 N'Kantu, the Living Mummy: A previously existing character. N'Kantu is an undead prince of Ancient Egypt.
 Frankenstein: An intelligent clone of the original Frankenstein's Monster. How this process did not produce different clones of the various individual body parts making up the original Monster was briefly mentioned in issue #1. The response was "Don't go there".
 Gorilla-Man I: A previously existing character. Kenneth Hale is a man trapped in a gorilla's body. He is now a member of the Agents of Atlas.
 John Doe: A zombie depicted as having normal human-level intelligence, in contrast to other zombie characters in the Marvel universe.

Secret Invasion

A third group of "Commandos" are introduced in Mighty Avengers #13. After discovering the Skrull invasion, Nick Fury assembles a team made up of the offspring of various superheroes and supervillains. This team members are:

 Quake: Former S.H.I.E.L.D. member and daughter of Mister Hyde. She possesses the power to create earthquake like vibrations.
 Phobos: The ten-year-old son of Ares. He possesses the power to cause fear in others by looking in their eyes.
 Druid: The son of Doctor Druid who has inherited some of his father's skill with magic.
 Yo-Yo: The daughter of the Griffin. She can run at superhuman speed and bounces back to the point where she began running.
 Hellfire: The grandson of the Phantom Rider. He is able to charge a chain with fire to wield as a weapon.
 Stonewall: Son of the Absorbing Man. Daisy Johnson bails him out of jail after he is imprisoned for hitting a cop. Possesses superhuman strength. Very little so far has been revealed about the character.

Dark Reign
In Secret Warriors #4 and #5 as seen during the Dark Reign storyline, it is revealed that 1200 S.H.I.E.L.D. agents refused to join H.A.M.M.E.R. following Norman Osborn's rise to power. Under the leadership of Dum Dum Dugan and Gabe Jones, they became a private military company which is hired by Nick Fury to fight against both HYDRA and H.A.M.M.E.R.

Black Ops version
A new incarnation of the Howling Commandos is ordered to apprehend the Punisher after he relocates to Los Angeles. The black ops version is led by Sidewinder and its members include Ruby Red, Myers, and Buzzkill.

Phil Coulson's Howling Commandos
Phil Coulson later formed his version of the Howling Commandos to combat Dormammu's Mindless Plague. 
The team consisted of:
 Frankenstein's Monster
 Man-Thing
 N'Kantu, the Living Mummy
 Zombie

Howling Commandos of S.H.I.E.L.D

A new team of Howling Commandos under the command of S.T.A.K.E. were part of the All-New All-Different Marvel led by the rebuilt LMD of Dum Dum Dugan and under the supervision of Warwolf. It consists of:
 Jasper Sitwell (zombie form)
 Vampire by Night
 Man-Thing
 Manphibian
 Orrgo
 Teen Abomination
 Hit-Monkey

Other versions

MAX
In Garth Ennis' Fury and Fury: Peacemaker, the Howling Commandos were an OSS special operations unit created by Fury and modeled after the SAS. Most of the unit's lineup were wiped out following D-Day, and only Fury and two other members survived (one of whom is most likely Dum-Dum Dugan, who appears in Fury MAX).

Ultimate Marvel
In the Ultimate universe, Howling Commandos were a US Army Ranger unit, escorting an imprisoned Wolverine during the Gulf War. The convoy was attacked by the Iraqi Republican Guard, killing all but Fury. Dum-Dum Dugan appears in the present day, hinting that he was elsewhere at the time.

During the Ultimate X-Men comic, Nick Fury dispatches a special S.H.I.E.L.D. unit to protect the Triskelion from elements of the Academy of Tomorrow, who came to break out one of their own.

A new version of the Howling Commandos appeared in Ultimate Comics: Ultimates #20; S.H.I.E.L.D. Director Monica Chang grants Nick Fury and ex-HYDRA soldier Abigail Brand to take on the growing power of Hydra.

The full team finally makes its debut during the Dark Ultimates' attack on Earth. Besides Nick Fury, Monica Chang and Abigail Brand, the roster consists of Punisher, Falcon, Stature, Dum Dum Dugan, Danny "The Ghost" Ketch, Emil "The Abomination" Blonsky, and Hercules

Mrs. Deadpool and the Howling Commandos

During the Secret Wars storyline, a variation of the Howling Commandos resides in the Battleworld domain of Monster Metropolis which is located beneath the Kingdom of Manhattan. It consists of Frankenstein's Monster, Invisible Man, Man-Thing, Marcus the Centaur, N'Kantu the Living Mummy, and Werewolf by Night.

In other media

Television
 The WWII Howling Commandos make a cameo appearance in the X-Men episode "Old Soldiers".
 The WWII Howling Commandos appear in The Avengers: Earth's Mightiest Heroes. the group consisted of Captain America, James Buchanan “Bucky” Barnes, and several unnamed characters who are canonically as follows (Dum Dum Dugan, Gabe Jones, Izzy Cohen, Jack Fury, Percy Pinkerton, Rebel Ralston, and James Howlett [Wolverine]).
 Nick Fury's Howling Commandos appear in the Ultimate Spider-Man two-part episode "Blade and the Howling Commandos".
 Nick Fury's Howling Commandos appear in Hulk and the Agents of S.M.A.S.H..

Marvel Cinematic Universe
The WWII Howling Commandos appear in media set in the Marvel Cinematic Universe. Following their first appearance in the live-action film Captain America: The First Avenger, they make subsequent appearances in the live-action television series Agents of S.H.I.E.L.D. episode "Shadows" and the Agent Carter episode "The Iron Ceiling". Additionally, alternate timeline versions of the Howling Commandos appear in the Disney+ animated series What If...? episode "What If... Captain Carter Were the First Avenger?".

See also
 List of Marvel Comics superhero debuts

References

 

 
Articles about multiple fictional characters